Chen Lin (ca. 1260–1320) was a Chinese landscape painter during the Yuan Dynasty (1271–1368). His specific birth and death dates are not known.

Chen was born in Hangzhou in the Zhejiang province. His style name was 'Zhongmei'. Chen was instructed by Zhao Mengfu. He specialized in landscape, human figure, and bird-and-flower paintings, and his style utilized bold and vigorous strokes with light colors.

Notes

References
Barnhart, R. M. et al. (1997). Three thousand years of Chinese painting. New Haven, Yale University Press. 

Year of death unknown
Year of birth uncertain
Yuan dynasty landscape painters
Artists from Hangzhou
Painters from Zhejiang